FC Rogachev is a Belarusian football club based in Rogachev, Gomel Oblast. The club is also known as Maxline Rogachev due to sponsorship deal with the sports betting company.

History
The team was founded in 1983 as Avtomobilist Rogachev and was renamed to KSM Rogachev next year. Since its foundation and until the dissolution of Soviet Union the team was playing in Belarusian SSR league. In 1988, they were renamed to Dnepr Rogachev.

In 1992, the team joined newly created Belarusian Second League, where they spent next six seasons. After successful 1996 season Dnepr was promoted to the First League. In 1998, they were renamed to FC Rogachev, in 2001, after partnering with local football academy, to Rogachev-DUSSh-1 and finally to Dnepr-DUSSh-1 Rogachev in 2002.

The team spent nine seasons in First League until they finished at the last (16th) place in 2005 and were to be relegated back to the Second League. However, due to financial troubles, the team disbanded in early 2006.

Between 2007 and 2013 the amateur team representing Rogachev played in Gomel Oblast league. In 2014, the team reformed as MKK-Dnepr Rogachev and rejoined Second League, before reverting to classic name Dnepr Rogachev in 2015. Since 2021 the team performed as BK Maxline Rogachev due to sponsorship deal.

Current squad
As of March 2023

External links
 Profile at teams.by
 Profile at football.by
 

Football clubs in Belarus
Gomel Region
Association football clubs established in 1983
1983 establishments in Belarus